Live at Hammersmith is a live album by the British hard rock band The Darkness. The album was released on 15 June 2018 and is the first live album the band has released.

Background
The album and the track listing was announced on 25 April 2018. The album is a live recording of the full setlist from the band's performance at the Eventim Apollo in London in December 2017, with mastering done by band member Dan Hawkins. People who pre-ordered the album instantly received the promo-singles ‘Buccaneers of Hispaniola’ and 'I Believe in a Thing Called Love'. It was released on 15 June later that year on CD, Vinyl and Cassette.

Track listing
Track listing taken from Spotify

Personnel
Justin Hawkins – vocals, guitars, piano
Dan Hawkins – guitars, backing vocals
Frankie Poullain – bass, backing vocals
Rufus Tiger Taylor – drums, backing vocals

References

2018 live albums
Albums recorded at the Hammersmith Apollo
The Darkness (band) albums
Cooking Vinyl live albums